Daniel Anderson (born 16 May 1979 in England) is an English-born Canadian soccer player, who works as coach at The West Island Soccer School.

Career
Anderson has played for Dagenham & Redbridge in England in 2004 and 2005. In 2004, he also played for Sunnana SK, a team in the third Swedish division. He trained over the years with Nottingham Forest, Crystal Palace, Watford, Plymouth Agyle and Chesterfield. He was also selected to be part of the national U-22 team which won the gold medal in the "Jeux de la Francophonie" in 1997.

Coaching career
Since 1999 he has owned The West Island Soccer School, and is the technical director of the FC 3 Lacs Club.

References

1979 births
Living people
Canadian expatriate sportspeople in the United States
Canadian expatriate sportspeople in England
Canadian expatriate soccer players
Canadian expatriate sportspeople in Sweden
Canadian Soccer League (1998–present) players
Canadian soccer players
Dagenham & Redbridge F.C. players
English emigrants to Canada
Association football defenders
Naturalized citizens of Canada
Robert Morris Colonials men's soccer players
Trois-Rivières Attak players